Viasat History is a pay television channel owned by the Swedish media company, Viasat World LTD. The channel broadcasts history series from around the world with a focus on the ancient world, historical drama, royal history, travel history and religious history. Viasat History is a 24-hour channel, broadcasting in Central and Eastern Europe, Russia and Commonwealth of Independent States.

With headquarters in London, United Kingdom, the channel started initially to broadcast to Scandinavian countries and after a few years expanded to the Baltic countries with subtitles and many East European markets.

Viasat History acquires programming from international distributors and production houses.
Since 2012, Viasat History together with sister channels Viasat Explore and Viasat Nature are broadcast in HD together with the SD feed on the Viasat satellite platform.

Since 6 September 2022, Viasat History is removing war-themed programs from its television network. New historical content is being released instead.

Programming

 Adolf Hitler
 Alexander's Lost World
 Anne Boleyn: Arrest, Trial, Execution 
 Bettany Hughes
 Black Ops
 Bomb Hunters
 Cold War
 Combat School 
 Countdown to War
 Deadliest Warrior
 Diana, Princess of Wales 
 Escape Or Die!
 Forbidden History
 Inside America's Secret Weapons Lab: DARPA 
 Instruments of Death
 Jago Cooper
 Live Fire 
 Man At Arms: Art Of War 
 Mariana Moculescu Show
 Mihai Eminescu
 Mihai Viteazu
 Munich: The Real Assassins
 My Forbidden Past
 Mysteries at the Museum
 Napoleon I
 Napoleon II
 Nicolae Ceaușescu
 Queen Elizabeth I
 Queen Elizabeth II 
 Pearl Harbor
 Prince Philip, Duke of Edinburgh
 Secret Ops
 Special Forces
 Special Forces Heroes
 The History of Art 
 The History of Cars 
 The History of Cinema 
 The History of Cities 
 The History of Countries
 The History of Food and Drink
 The History of Hair Wigs 
 The History of Houses 
 The History of Men and Women 
 The History of Music 
 The History of Paper 
 The History of Porn 
 The History of Radio
 The History of Sports
 The History of Television 
 The Secret War
 The Selection
 Weapons That Changed the World
 Wicked Inventions
 World War I
 World War II
 WWII Air Crash Detectives

References

Television channels in Norway
Television channels in Sweden
Television stations in Denmark
Television channels in Russia

Modern Times Group
Television channels and stations established in 2004
Television channels in North Macedonia